My American Wife is a 1922 American silent drama film directed by Sam Wood and starring Gloria Swanson. The film was produced by Famous Players-Lasky and distributed by Paramount Pictures. It is not known whether the film currently survives, which suggests that it is a lost film.

Plot
As described in a film magazine, Manuel La Tessa (Moreno), son of a wealthy South American family, meets Natalie Chester, a young Kentucky woman whose horse has won the race at a South American track. Manuel gives a party in her honor where she is insulted by one of the guest, and Manuel knocks down the offender. The offender, whose father is a powerful figure in the country's politics, challenges Manuel to a duel but also hires a man to hide in ambush and kill his opponent. Manuel is only wounded and Natalie nurses him back to health. His mother Donna Isabella La Tassa (Chapman) disapproves of the young American woman and asks her to leave. Natalie loves Manuel and seeks to uncover the mystery of the bullet fired at him during the duel. She finally locates the attempted assassin and with numerous bribes gets him to appear against the man who hired him to do it. This ruins the chance of the man from being elected a senator, and Manuel takes his seat. He tells all that he shall strive to do his best with the help of his American wife.

Cast

References

External links

1922 films
1922 drama films
Silent American drama films
American silent feature films
American black-and-white films
Famous Players-Lasky films
Films directed by Sam Wood
Paramount Pictures films
1920s American films